Victor Dayrit Rodriguez (born December 23, 1973) is a Filipino lawyer who served as the Executive Secretary from June to September 2022 in President Bongbong Marcos' administration, and previously served as Marcos' campaign spokesperson. He was also the executive vice president and general campaign manager of Partido Federal ng Pilipinas during the Marcos 2022 campaign.

Education
Rodriguez attended the University of Santo Tomas in Manila where he obtained his law degree. He also had executive education at the National University of Singapore (NUS) Negotiation and Influence Program.

Career
Rodriguez is a lawyer and was involved in various law organizations. He is the managing lawyer of Rodriguez & Partners Law Firm which he helped establish in 2003. He is also president of Quezon City Trial Lawyers League, and was treasurer of the UST Law Alumni Foundation (USTLAFI). He was also deputy general counsel of the Integrated Bar of the Philippines.

He was first elected as a barangay kagawad of Sacred Heart, Quezon City before being elected as its barangay captain at age 19 and became the youngest person to hold the position. He joined the Quezon City government in 2002 after his one-decade tenure as barangay captain, and was appointed special assistant to the chief of the Business Permits and Licensing Office by then Mayor Feliciano Belmonte Jr. He then became officer in charge of the city's Community Relations Office.

Rodriguez co-founded the tabloid Saksi Ngayon with Antonio Lagdameo Jr.

2022 Marcos presidential campaign
Rodriguez served as spokesperson and chief of staff of then-candidate Bongbong Marcos during his presidential campaign in the 2022 elections. After Marcos won the presidency, Rodriguez became part of lead the transition team to help Marcos build the initial composition of his cabinet.

Executive Secretary
Rodriguez relinquished his role as Marcos Jr.’s spokesperson in preparation for his role as President Bongbong Marcos's Executive Secretary.

Embattled by controversies relating to his roles in the sugar importation order fiasco and contentious appointments of some government officials, Rodriguez resigned on September 17, 2022, after less than three months in his position, but continued on in the role of Presidential Chief of Staff; Rodriguez cited the need to spend more time with his family. Rodriguez unsuccessfully attempted to give himself additional powers as the Presidential Chief of Staff after Marcos rejected his plan upon the recommendation of Marcos' Chief Presidential Legal Counsel Juan Ponce Enrile.

References

1973 births
Living people
21st-century Filipino lawyers
University of Santo Tomas alumni
National University of Singapore alumni
Bongbong Marcos administration cabinet members
People from Quezon City
Executive Secretaries of the Philippines